The Higher School Certificate is an academic qualification in Mauritius awarded upon the completion of Upper 6 Form, the final stage of secondary school. The qualification is awarded upon earning passing marks on the A-level exams administered by the Mauritius Examinations Syndicate, in conjunction with the University of Cambridge Local Examinations Syndicate of the Cambridge International Examinations board.

Editions

Higher School Certificate (HSC)
The traditional Higher School Certificate (HSC) is the main school-leaving qualification awarded by Mauritian secondary schools. Requirements include A Levels and AS Levels in subjects chosen by the student. 

Successful students may receive academic recognition and are eligible to compete for laureateship, a scholarship scheme offered by the Mauritian government for students pursuing higher education.

Higher School Certificate Professional Qualification (HSC Pro)
The Higher School Certificate Professional Qualification (HSC Pro) is an alternative school-leaving qualification with a modified curriculum and structure, which allows students to pursue both an academic curriculum and vocational training, to be prepared for tertiary studies as well as employment. The qualification was introduced as a pilot in 2015.

There are certain unique features of this qualification that distinguish it from the traditional Higher School Certificate. One is the inclusion of the Cambridge International Technical in ICT, adapted to the local context, in place of an A Level. Another is replacement of the AS General Paper with a mandatory alternative, the AS Global Perspectives, which is designed to develop communication, analytical and research skills.  Another is the Work Placement Component (WPC), a structured and supervised placement that provides practical work experience in the industry. 

The structure for the qualification includes:
2 or 3 A Levels, including the Cambridge International Technical in ICT
2 or 3 AS Levels, including the AS Alternative to the General Paper
The Work Placement Component (WPC)

The alternative qualification is recognised by local and overseas universities, enabling students who successfully complete the qualification to seek admission in universities. HSC Pro students may not compete for laureateship, as can traditional HSC students, but may participate in alternative schemes provided by the Mauritian government for further studies as well as employment.

Subjects 
Typically 3 to 5 primary subjects are chosen to study at AS-level, and at least 3 subjects are further studied to A2-level. Both the AS (Advanced Subsidiary) and A2 years must be completed for the full A-level qualification to be completed; an AS-level qualification may also be awarded after the first year.

AS-level 
Cambridge Higher School Certificate candidates may take the following subjects at AS-level: 

General Paper
Divinity
Islamic Studies
Hinduism
French Language
Environmental Management
Hindi Literature
Arabic Language
Chinese Language
German Language
Spanish Language
Urdu Language
Hindi Language
Tamil Language
Telugu Language
English Language
Language and Literature in English
Law
Art and Design
Travel and Tourism
Physical Education
Computer Science
Marine Science
Thinking Skills
Literature in English
Geography
History
Sociology
Biology
Design and Technology
Accounting
Business Studies
Economics
Mathematics

A-level
Cambridge Higher School Certificate candidates may take the following subjects at A2-level: 

Divinity
Islamic Studies
Hinduism
Law
French (Mauritius)
Food Studies
Art and Design
Travel and Tourism
Physical Education
Design and Textiles
Urdu
Arabic
Hindi
Marathi
Tamil
Telugu
Computing
Marine Science
Thinking Skills
Literature in English
Geography
History
Psychology
Sociology
Biology
Chemistry
Physics
Music
Design and Technology
Accounting
Business Studies
Economics
Mathematics
Chinese
German
Spanish
Computer Science

HSC Pro
Higher School Certificate Professional Qualification (HSC Pro) students additionally take the following subjects: 
Cambridge International Technical in ICT
AS Global Perspectives

Progression
Students who successfully earn the Higher School Certificate may then progress onto tertiary study. Students who are unsuccessful in obtaining the qualification may then transition from the academic stream to the vocational stream and progress onto vocational programmes of study. Students may also choose to obtain A Level qualifications at a later time.

See also
 Education in Mauritius
 Form III Certificate
 Certificate of Primary Education
 School Certificate (Mauritius)

References

Education in Mauritius
Graduation
Secondary school qualifications